Ruth Whitehead Whaley (February 2, 1901 – December 23, 1977) was the third African American woman admitted to practice law in New York in 1925 and the first in North Carolina in 1933. She was the first Black woman to graduate from Fordham University School of Law, where she graduated cum laude in 1924.

Early life 
Whaley was born on February 2, 1901, in Goldsboro, North Carolina. Both of her parents, Charles A. Whitehead and Dora (née Cox) Whitehead, were school teachers. She was a congregant of the AME Zion Church.

Ruth C. Whitehead married Herman S. Whaley in 1920 in Goldsboro. Her husband encouraged her to study law despite the difficulties of racism. The couple had two children, Herman W. Whaley and Ruth M. (Whaley) Spearman.

Education 
Whaley attended Livingstone Prep School and Livingstone College in Salisbury, North Carolina, a historically Black college (HBCU) founded in 1879. She graduated in June 1919 after earning an A.B. degree. After college, she worked as a teacher at the North Carolina State School for the Deaf in Raleigh.

Career 
In 1949, Whaley penned an essay entitled "Women Lawyers Must Balk Both Color and Sex Bias," in which she described the "penalty" of women, and especially minority women, lawyers who must outperform their male colleagues lest "the overlooked errors of a male colleague become the colossal blunders of the woman." Since the legal profession had been for centuries a "male precinct," it was easy to single out the mistakes of a woman lawyer.

She maintained a private law practice in New York City until 1944. Whaley held appointed positions in New York City including Director of Staff and Community Relations in the Department of Welfare and Deputy Commissioner of the Department of Housing and Buildings. From 1951 until 1973 she served as the Secretary of the New York City Board of Estimate.

Throughout her life, Whaley was active in Democratic party politics. She was the first Black woman candidate chosen to represent the interests of Tammany Hall in the City Council election of 1945.

Whaley was a member of Sigma Gamma Rho sorority. She served as the Vice President of the National Council of Negro Women and was the founder and former President of the Negro Business and Professional Women's Club.

A longtime resident of Harlem, she retired from the Secretary of the New York City Board of Estimate in 1973. She died on December 23, 1977, and is buried in Mount Hope Cemetery in Yonkers.

Legacy 
On June 8, 2000, the Family Academy, then an alternative public school in Manhattan that is now P.S. 241, named their auditorium after Whaley. The Black Law Students Association at Fordham University Law School named their annual award the Ruth Whitehead Whaley Award in 1979. She was inducted into the alumni Hall of Honor at Fordham University on October 22, 2014.

See also
List of first women lawyers and judges in North Carolina

References

 J. Clay Smith, ed., Rebels in Law: Voices in History of Black Women Lawyers, 2000.
 J. Clay Smith, Emancipation: The Making of the Black Lawyer, 1844-1944, 1999.

New York (state) lawyers
Fordham University School of Law alumni
1901 births
1977 deaths
People from Goldsboro, North Carolina
Livingstone College alumni
African-American women lawyers
African-American lawyers
20th-century American women lawyers
20th-century American lawyers
20th-century African-American women
20th-century African-American people